The Palace of Whitehall (also spelled White Hall) at Westminster was the main residence of the English monarchs from 1530 until 1698, when most of its structures, except notably Inigo Jones's Banqueting House of 1622, were destroyed by fire. Henry VIII moved the royal residence to White Hall after the old royal apartments at the nearby Palace of Westminster were themselves destroyed by fire.  Although the Whitehall palace has not survived, the area where it was located is still called Whitehall and has remained a centre of government.

White Hall was at one time the largest palace in Europe, with more than 1,500 rooms, overtaking the Vatican, before itself being overtaken by the expanding Palace of Versailles, which was to reach 2,400 rooms. The palace gives its name, Whitehall, to the street located on the site on which many of the current administrative buildings of the present-day British government are situated, and hence metonymically to the central government itself.

History 
By the 13th century, the Palace of Westminster had become the centre of government in England, and had been the main London residence of the king since 1049.  The surrounding area became a popular and expensive location. Walter de Grey, Archbishop of York, bought a nearby property as his London residence soon after 1240, calling it York Place.

King Edward I stayed at York Place on several occasions while work was carried out at Westminster, and enlarged it to accommodate his entourage.  York Place was rebuilt during the 15th century and was expanded so much by Cardinal Wolsey that it was rivalled by only Lambeth Palace as the greatest house in London, the King's London palaces included.  Consequently, when King Henry VIII removed the cardinal from power in 1530, he acquired York Place to replace Westminster (the royal residential, or 'privy', area of which had been gutted by fire in 1512) as his main London residence, inspecting its possessions in the company of Anne Boleyn.  The name Whitehall was first recorded in 1532; it had its origins in the white stone used for the buildings.
 
King Henry VIII hired the Flemish artist Anton van den Wyngaerde to redesign York Place, and he extended it during his lifetime.  Inspired by Richmond Palace, he included sporting facilities, with a bowling green, indoor real tennis court, a pit for cock fighting (on the site of the Cabinet Office, 70 Whitehall) and a tiltyard for jousting (now the site of Horse Guards Parade).  It is estimated that more than £30,000 (several million at present-day value) were spent during the 1540s, half as much again as the construction of the entire Bridewell Palace. Henry VIII married two of his wives at the palace—Anne Boleyn in 1533 and Jane Seymour in 1536, and died there in January 1547.

In 1611, the palace hosted the first known performance of William Shakespeare's play The Tempest. In February 1613 it was the venue for the wedding of Princess Elizabeth and Frederick V of the Palatinate.
 
James VI and I made significant changes to the buildings, notably the construction in 1622 of a new Banqueting House built to a design by Inigo Jones to replace a series of previous banqueting houses dating from the time of Elizabeth I. Its decoration was finished in 1634 with the completion of a ceiling by Sir Peter Paul Rubens, commissioned by Charles I (who was to be executed in front of the building in 1649). By 1650 Whitehall Palace was the largest complex of secular buildings in England, with more than 1,500 rooms.  Its layout was irregular, and its constituent parts were of many different sizes and in several different architectural styles, making it look more like a small town than a single building. The irregularity of the buildings was increased by the penchant of courtiers to build onto their assigned lodgings, either at their own expense or that of the King's. Sir Stephen Fox, Charles II's Clerk of the Green Cloth, obtained permission from the Office of Works in the 1660s to build additions to the three rooms he was assigned. By the time he was finished he had constructed a grand mansion with coach house, stables, and a view over the Thames, all within the palace network.
 

 
Charles II commissioned minor works. Like his father, he died at the palace—but from a stroke. James II ordered various changes by Sir Christopher Wren, including a chapel finished in 1687, rebuilding of the queen's apartments (c. 1688), and the queen's private lodgings (1689). The Catholic chapel of James II, constructed during a period of fierce anti-Catholicism in England, attracted much criticism and also awe when it was completed in December 1686. The ceiling was adorned with 8,132 pieces of gold leaf, and at the east end of the nave an enormous marble altarpiece (40 ft. high x 25 ft. wide) designed by Wren and carved by Grinling Gibbons dominated the room.

Destruction  
 
By 1691 the palace had become the largest and most complex in Europe. On 10 April a fire broke out in the much-renovated apartment previously used by the Duchess of Portsmouth, damaging the older palace structures, though apparently not the state apartments. This actually gave a greater cohesiveness to the remaining complex. At the end of 1694 Mary II died in Kensington Palace of smallpox, and on the following 24 January lay in state at Whitehall; William and Mary had avoided Whitehall in favour of their palace at Kensington.

A second fire on 4 January 1698 destroyed most of the remaining residential and government buildings. It was started inadvertently by a servant in an upper room who had hung wet linen around a burning charcoal brazier to dry. The linen caught fire and the flames quickly spread throughout the palace complex, raging for 15 hours before firefighters could extinguish it. The following day, the wind picked up and re-ignited the fire farther north. Christopher Wren, then the King's Surveyor of Works, was ordered expressly by William III to focus manpower on saving the architectural jewel of the complex, the Banqueting House. Wren ordered bricklayers to block-up the main window on the building's south side to block the flames from entering. Around 20 buildings were destroyed to create a firebreak, but this did little to inhibit the westward spread of the flames.

John Evelyn noted succinctly on 5 January: "Whitehall burnt! nothing but walls and ruins left." Beside the Banqueting House, some buildings survived in Scotland Yard and some facing the park, along with the so-called Holbein Gate, eventually demolished in 1769.
 
During the fire many works of art were destroyed, probably including Michelangelo's Cupid, a famous sculpture bought as part of the Gonzaga collections in the seventeenth century. Also lost were Hans Holbein the Younger's iconic mural Portrait of Henry VIII and Gian Lorenzo Bernini's marble portrait bust of King Charles I.

Present day 

The Banqueting House is the only integral building of the complex now standing, although it has been somewhat modified. Various other parts of the old palace still exist, often incorporated into new buildings in the Whitehall government complex. These include a tower and other parts of the former covered tennis courts from the time of Henry VIII, built into the Old Treasury and Cabinet Office at 70 Whitehall.

Beginning in 1938, the east side of the site was redeveloped with the building now housing the Ministry of Defence (MOD), now known as MOD Main Building. Following a request from Queen Mary in 1938 and a promise in Parliament, provision was made for the preservation of the cellar. Accordingly, it was encased in steel and concrete and relocated  to the west and nearly  deeper in 1949, when building was resumed at the site after the Second World War. This was carried out without any significant damage to the structure and it now rests within the basement of the building.

 
A number of marble carvings from the former chapel at Whitehall (which was built for James II) are present in St. Andrew's Church, Burnham-on-Sea, in Somerset, to where they were moved in 1820 after having originally been removed to Westminster Abbey in 1706.

See also 

 List of demolished buildings and structures in London
 Official royal residences in London:
 Palace of Westminster – The principal residence of the English kings from 1049 until 1530
 Kensington Palace – The principal residence of English and later British monarchs between 1689 and 1760
 St. James's Palace – The principal royal residence from 1702 until 1837, which continues today as the formal palace of the monarchy as the Court of St James's
 Bushy House – future William IV took up residence here in 1797 when appointed Ranger of Bushy Park, and remained through his reign as king (1830–1837)
 Buckingham Palace – The principal royal residence since 1837

References

External links 

 Information about the Palace of Whitehall from the Survey of London: Whitehall Palace: History; Whitehall Palace: Buildings; The Banqueting House
 Palace of Whitehall timeline
 Enlarged 1680 plan of Whitehall, showing the location of the tennis courts, cockpit, tiltyard on the St. James's Park side, and the configuration of buildings on the river side
 View of Whitehall in 1669, showing the Banqueting House and Holbein Gate
 A historical record of Whitehall Palace
 

 

Former buildings and structures in the City of Westminster
Royal buildings in London
Royal residences in England
Tudor royal palaces in England
York Place, Westminster
Whitehall